Diondion is a communal section of the Jean-Rabel commune, in the Môle-Saint-Nicolas Arrondissement, in the Nord-Ouest department.

References

Communal sections of Haiti
Populated places in Nord-Ouest (department)